A by-election was held for the New South Wales Legislative Assembly electorate of Central Cumberland on 28 September 1889 because of the resignation of Frank Farnell due to bankruptcy.

Dates

Result

Frank Farnell resigned due to bankruptcy.

See also
Electoral results for the district of Central Cumberland
List of New South Wales state by-elections

References

1889 elections in Australia
New South Wales state by-elections
1890s in New South Wales